Daqiao Township is a township of Shiping County in south-central Yunnan province, China; it is situated about  northwest of the county seat and  northwest of Mengzi City, the prefectural seat, as the crow flies. , it has nine villages under its administration.

References 

Township-level divisions of Honghe Hani and Yi Autonomous Prefecture
Shiping County